The April Uprising was an insurrection organised by the Bulgarians in the Ottoman Empire from April to May 1876. The regular Ottoman Army and irregular bashi-bazouk units brutally suppressed the rebels, resulting in a public outcry in Europe, with many famous intellectuals condemning the atrocities—labelled the Bulgarian Horrors or Bulgarian atrocities—by the Ottomans and supporting the oppressed Bulgarian population. This outrage was key for the re-establishment of Bulgaria in 1878. 

The 1876 uprising involved only those parts of the Ottoman territories populated predominantly by Bulgarians. The emergence of Bulgarian national sentiments was closely related to the re-establishment of the independent Bulgarian Orthodox Church in 1870.

Background

In Europe, in the 18th century, the classic non-national states were the multi-ethnic empires such as the Ottoman Empire and the Austro-Hungarian Empire, whose population belonged to many ethnic groups and spoke many languages. The idea of nation state became more prominent during the 19th century. The most noticeable characteristic was the degree to which nation states used the state as an instrument of national unity in economic, social and cultural life. By the 18th century, the Ottomans had fallen well behind the rest of Europe in science, technology, and industry. However, the Bulgarian population was also suppressed socially and politically under Ottoman rule. Additionally, more immediate causes for the greater mobilisation compared to earlier revolts were the severe internal and external problems which the Ottoman Empire experienced in the middle of the 1870s. In 1875, taxes levied on non-Muslims were raised for fear of state bankruptcy, which, in turn, caused additional tension between Muslims and Christians and led to the Herzegovinian rebellion and the Stara Zagora revolt in Bulgaria. The failure of the Ottomans to handle the Herzegovinian uprising successfully showed the weakness of the Ottoman state, and the atrocities committed during its suppression discredited it internationally. In the late 19th century, European ideas of nationalism were adopted by the Bulgarian elite.

Preparation
In November 1875, activists of the Bulgarian Revolutionary Central Committee met in the Romanian town of Giurgiu and decided that the political situation was suitable for a general uprising. The uprising was scheduled for April or May 1876. The territory of the country was divided into five revolutionary districts with centers in Vratsa (leader-Stoyan Zaimov), Veliko Tarnovo (Stefan Stambolov), Sliven  (Ilarion Dragostinov), Plovdiv (Panayot Volov-who later gave his position to his assistant Georgi Benkovski) and Sofia (Nikola Obretenov).

The rebels had been hoarding arms and ammunition for some time and even constructed a makeshift cannon out of cherry-wood.

In the progress of the preparation of the uprising, the organisers gave up the idea of a fifth revolutionary district in Sofia due to the deplorable situation of the local revolutionary committees and moved the centre of the fourth revolutionary district from Plovdiv to Panagyurishte. On 14 April 1876, a general meeting of the committees from the fourth revolutionary district was held in the Oborishte locality near Panagyurishte to discuss the proclamation of the insurrection. One of the delegates, however, disclosed the plot to the Ottoman authorities. On , Ottoman police made an attempt to arrest the leader of the local revolutionary committee in Koprivshtitsa, Todor Kableshkov. The Bulgarian Revolutionary Central Committee meeting protocols from 17th of April 1876 chaired by Benkovski discuss on retaliating against the Turkish and Muslim population in mixed regions opposing the uprising. These actions include killing, arson of property and homes and seizure of assets. On the other hand, Muslims who did not resist were to be protected in the same way as the Bulgarian population.  The committee also gives approval for torching towns and villages. There is no evidence that this plan was implemented.

Outbreak and suppression

In conformity with the decisions taken at Oborishte, on 20 April 1876 the local rebel committee attacked and surrounded the headquarters of the Ottoman police in Koprivshtitsa commanded by Necip Aga. At least two Ottoman police officials were killed and Necip Aga was forced to release arrested Bulgarian rebel suspects. Necip Aga and his close officials managed to escape the siege. However, due to this incident the Bulgarian rebels had to proclaim the insurrection two weeks in advance of the planned date. Within several days, the rebellion spread to the whole Sredna Gora and to a number of towns and villages in the northwestern Rhodopes. The insurrection broke out in the other revolutionary districts, as well, though on a much smaller scale. The areas of Gabrovo, Tryavna, and Pavlikeni also revolted in force, as well as several villages north and south of Sliven and near Berovo (in the present-day North Macedonia).

According to a contemporary report by Walter Baring, a secretary of the British Embassy to the Ottoman Empire, the Muslim civilian population was not significantly affected. This was also substantiated by the reports of Eugene Schuyler and James F. Clarke, according to whom very few peaceful Muslims were killed. 
This has been the subject of dispute among modern historians.  According to Richard Shannon fewer than 200 Muslims were killed, very few of them non-combatants.  According to the report written by Schuyler and American journalist Januarius MacGahan, even the Ottoman government did not claim more than 500 Muslims killed, most of them in battle. By contrast American historian Justin McCarthy claims that during the revolts over 1,000 Muslims were slaughtered and many more expelled. Stanford Shaw claims in History of the Ottoman Empire and Modern Turkey that many more Muslims were killed during the April Uprising than Christians. According to Barbara Jelavich the beginning of the April Uprising was accompanied by a massacre of Muslim civilians (without specifying casualties).

The Ottoman response was immediate and severe. They mobilized detachments of regular troops and also irregular bashi-bazouks. These forces attacked the first insurgent towns as early as 25 April. The Turkish forces massacred civilian populations, the principal places being Panagurishte, Perushtitza, Bratzigovo, and Batak (see Batak massacre). By the middle of May, the insurrection was completely suppressed; one of the last sparks of resistance was poet Hristo Botev's attempt to come to the rebels' rescue with a detachment of Bulgarian political émigrés resident in Romania, ending with the unit's rout and Botev's death.

The most detailed contemporaneous account was that of Eugene Schuyler. After visiting some of the sites, Schuyler published a report detailing the atrocities. He reported that fifty-eight villages had been destroyed, five monasteries demolished, and fifteen thousand rebels killed. The American historian Richard Millman states that Schuyler visited personally only 11 of the villages he reported on. Schuyler, however certainly visited Batak and many other of the destroyed towns and villages, including Perushtitsa
 and Panagyurishte. Millman also claims that the accepted reality of the massacres is largely a myth. Contemporary Bulgarian historians generally accept the number of Bulgarian casualties at the end of the uprising to be around 30,000. According to British and French figures, 12,000–15,000 Bulgarian civilians were massacred during the uprising. Tomasz Kamusella claims that the numbers of victims may not distinguish between Orthodox Christians and Muslims, while acknowledging that there were about only 500 Muslims deaths according to the report of the Ottoman government.

Reaction in the West

Press reports

News of massacres of Bulgarians reached European embassies in Istanbul in May and June 1876 through Bulgarian students at Robert College, the American college in the city. Faculty members at Robert College wrote to the British Ambassador and to the Istanbul correspondents of The Times and the Daily News.

An article about the massacres in the Daily News on 23 June provoked a question in Parliament about Britain's support for Turkey, and demands for an investigation. Prime Minister Benjamin Disraeli promised to conduct an investigation about what had really happened.

In July, the British Embassy in Istanbul sent a second secretary, Walter Baring, to Bulgaria to investigate the stories of atrocities. Baring did not speak Bulgarian (although he did speak Turkish) and British policy was officially pro-Turkish, so the Bulgarian community in Istanbul feared he would not report the complete story. They asked the American Consul in Istanbul, Eugene Schuyler, to conduct his own investigation.

Schuyler set off for Bulgaria on 23 July, four days after Baring. He was accompanied by a well-known American war correspondent, Januarius MacGahan, by a German correspondent, and by a Russian diplomat, Prince Aleksei Tseretelev.

Schuyler's group spent three weeks visiting Batak and other villages where massacres had taken place. Schuyler's official report, published in November 1876, said that fifty-eight villages in Bulgaria had been destroyed, five monasteries demolished, and fifteen thousand people in all massacred. The report was reprinted as a booklet and widely circulated in Europe.

Baring's report to the British government about the massacres was similar, but put the number of victims at about twelve thousand.

MacGahan's vivid articles from Bulgaria moved British public opinion against Turkey. He described in particular what he had seen in the town of Batak, where five thousand of a total of seven thousand residents had been slaughtered, beheaded or burned alive by Turkish irregulars, and their bodies left in piles around the town square and the church.

British response
Liberal Party leader William Ewart Gladstone published a  pamphlet on 6 September 1876, Bulgarian Horrors and the Question of the East, attacked the Disraeli government for its indifference to the Ottoman Empire's violent repression of the April Uprising. Gladstone made clear his hostility focused on the Turkish people, rather than on the Muslim religion. The Turks he said:

The political impact of the reports was immediate and dramatic. As the leader of the opposition, Gladstone called upon the government to withdraw its support for Turkey.  "I entreat my countrymen", he wrote, "upon whom far more than upon any other people in Europe it depends, to require and to insist that our government, which has been working in one direction, shall work in the other, and shall apply all its vigour to concur with the states of Europe in obtaining the extinction of the Turkish executive power in Bulgaria. Let the Turks now carry away their abuses in the only possible manner, namely, by carrying off themselves ..."

Prominent Europeans, including Charles Darwin, Oscar Wilde, Victor Hugo, and Giuseppe Garibaldi, spoke against the Turkish behavior in Bulgaria. When war with Russia started in 1877, the Turkish Government asked Britain for help, but the British government refused, citing public outrage caused by the Bulgarian massacres as the reason.

Political affairs and propaganda 
During the 19th century, British Empire typically supported Ottomans against their conflicts against Russian Empire, a common rival at the time, to curb its pan-Slavist and Orthodox Christian influence in Balkans. William Gladstone assumed a pro-Russian position on the conflict and was not concerned with the expansion of Russia's power projection. In contrast, the works of Frederick Burnaby present a pro-Turkish understanding of events. To investigate the accounts of massacres in British media, Burnaby embarked on a travel through Ottoman lands; his memoirs were published under the titles A Ride to Khiva: Travels and Adventures in Central Asia (1876) and On Horseback through Asia Minor (1877). According to Burnaby, many Western accounts of atrocities were exaggerated and sometimes fabricated and atrocities against Muslims were omitted from the press reports. The landlord of Burnaby in Ankara complains to him about this as such,

Burnaby's goal was to present a counter-narrative to the general Russophile attitude in Britain. According to Turkish historian Sinan Akıllı, his attempts manifested mixed results and where only partially successful in reversing the public opinion.

Aftermath
The April uprising was not successful itself, but due to the publicity given to the reprisals that followed, it led directly to each nation's demands for reform of the Ottoman Empire, and the Russo-Turkish War, which ended in Turkish defeat, and the signing of the Treaty of San Stefano in March 1878, followed in July that year by the Treaty of Berlin. It thus ultimately achieved its original purpose, the liberation of Bulgaria from the Ottoman Empire .

See also
Razlovtsi insurrection
Liberation of Bulgaria
Kresna–Razlog uprising
Bulgarian unification
Edwin Pears

References

Further reading
 Çiçek, Nazan. "The Turkish response to Bulgarian horrors: A study in English Turcophobia." Middle Eastern Studies 42.1 (2006): 87–102.
 Cicek, Nazan. "'Bulgarian Horrors' Revisited: The Many-Layered Manifestations of the Orientalist Discourse in Victorian Political Construction of the External, Intimate and Internal Other." Belleten 81.291 (2017): 525–568. online
 Jelavich, Charles  and Barbara Jelavich. The Establishment of the Balkan National States, 1804–1920 (U of Washington Press, 1977).
 Ković, Miloš. Disraeli and the Eastern Question (Oxford University Press, 2010)
 Millman, Richard. "The Bulgarian massacres reconsidered." Slavonic and East European Review 58.2 (1980): 218–231. online
 Prévost, Stéphanie. "WT Stead and the Eastern Question (1875–1911); or, How to Rouse England and Why?." 19: Interdisciplinary Studies in the Long Nineteenth Century (2013). online doi: 10.16995/ntn.654
 Saab,  Ann P. Reluctant Icon: Gladstone, Bulgaria and the Working Classes, 1856–1878 (Harvard University Press, 1991)
 Seton-Watson, R.W. Disraeli, Gladstone, and the Eastern question: a study in diplomacy and party politics (1935) pp 51–101.
 Shannon, Richard, and G.S.R. Kitson Clark. Gladstone and the Bulgarian agitation 1876 (Nelson, 1963).
 Stavrianos, L.S. "Balkan Crisis and the Treaty of Berlin: 1878" from The Balkans Since 1453 online
  Whitehead,  Cameron. "Reading Beside the Lines: Marginalia, W.E. Gladstone, and the International History of the Bulgarian Horrors." International History Review 37.4 (2015): 864–886.
 Whitehead, Cameron Ean Alfred. "The Bulgarian Horrors: culture and the international history of the Great Eastern Crisis, 1876–1878" (PhD Diss. University of British Columbia, 2014) online.

Primary sources
 Gladstone, William Ewart. Bulgarian Horrors and the Question of the East (J. Murray, 1876) online.

External links
 Walter Short, The Massacres of the Khilafah.
  "'The Bulgarian Horrors': Gladstone's Bulgarian Legacy" December 29, 2009,  interview with Professor Michael Meltev 
  "Mr Gladstone and the Horrors" documentary by Michael Meltev 2009

 
1876 in Bulgaria
19th-century rebellions
Persecution of Christians in the Ottoman Empire
April 1876 events
May 1876 events